is a Japanese former sprinter. He competed in the men's 400 metres at the 1952 Summer Olympics.

References

External links
 

1931 births
Possibly living people
Athletes (track and field) at the 1952 Summer Olympics
Japanese male sprinters
Olympic athletes of Japan
Place of birth missing (living people)